Kainji may refer to several locations in Nigeria:

Kainji Lake
Kainji Dam
Kainji National Park

It is also used to refer to a group of languages spoken around and to the east of the lake:
Kainji languages